The Yoga Sutras of Patañjali is a collection of Sanskrit sutras (aphorisms) on the theory and practice of yoga – 195 sutras (according to Vyāsa and Krishnamacharya) and 196 sutras (according to others, including BKS Iyengar). The Yoga Sutras was compiled in the early centuries CE, by the sage Patanjali in India who synthesized and organized knowledge about yoga from much older traditions.

The Yoga Sutras is best known for its reference to ashtanga, eight elements of practice culminating in samadhi. The eight elements are yama (abstinences), niyama (observances), asana (yoga posture), pranayama (breath control), pratyahara (withdrawal of the senses), dharana (concentration of the mind), dhyana (meditation) and samadhi (absorption). The main aim of practice is kaivalya, discernment of purusha, the witness-consciousness, as distinct from prakriti, the cognitive apparatus, and disentanglement of purusha from prakriti's muddled defilements.

The Yoga Sutras built on Samkhya notions of purusha and prakriti, and is often seen as complementary to it. It is closely related to Buddhism, incorporating some of its terminology. Samkhya, Yoga and Vedanta, as well as Jainism and Buddhism, can be seen as representing different manifestations of a broad stream of ascetic traditions in ancient India, in contrast to the Bhakti traditions and Vedic ritualism which were prevalent at the time.

The contemporary Yoga tradition holds the Yoga Sutras of Patañjali to be one of the foundational texts of classical Yoga philosophy. However, the appropriation - and misappropriation - of the Yoga Sutras and its influence on later systematizations of yoga has been questioned by David Gordon White, who argues that the text fell into relative obscurity for nearly 700 years from the 12th to 19th century, and made a comeback in the late 19th century due to the efforts of Swami Vivekananda, the Theosophical Society and others. It gained prominence as a classic in the 20th century.

Author and dating

Author
The colophons of manuscripts of the Yoga Sutras attribute the work to Patanjali. The identity of Patañjali has been the subject of academic debate because an author of the same name is credited with the authorship of the classic text on Sanskrit grammar named Mahābhāṣya that is firmly datable to the second century BC. Although some scholars argue that this is the same Patanjali who authored the Yoga Sutras, the two works are completely different in subject matter, and Indologist Louis Renou has shown that there are significant differences in language, grammar and vocabulary. Before the time of Bhoja (11th century), no known text conflates the identity of the two authors.

Dating
Philipp A. Maas assessed Patañjali's Pātañjalayogaśāstra's date to be about 400 CE, based on synchronisms between its arguments and those of Vasubandhu, on tracing the history of the commentaries on it published in the first millennium CE, on the opinions of earlier Sanskrit commentators, on the testimony of manuscript colophons and on a review of extant literature. This dating for the Pātañjalayogaśāstra was proposed as early as 1914 by Woods and has been accepted widely by academic scholars of the history of Indian philosophical thought.

Edwin Bryant, on the other hand, surveyed the major commentators in his translation of the Yoga Sūtras. He observed that "Most scholars date the text shortly after the turn of the Common Era (circa first to second century), but that it has been placed as early as several centuries before that." Bryant concluded that "A number of scholars have dated the Yoga Sūtras as late as the fourth or fifth century CE, but these arguments have all been challenged. ... All such arguments [for a late date] are problematic."

Michele Desmarais summarized a wide variety of dates assigned to Yogasutra, ranging from 500 BCE to 3rd century CE, noting that there is a paucity of evidence for any certainty. She stated the text may have been composed at an earlier date given conflicting theories on how to date it, but latter dates are more commonly accepted by scholars.

Compilation
The Yoga Sutras are a composite of various traditions. The levels of samādhi taught in the text resemble the Buddhist jhanas. According to Feuerstein, the Yoga Sutras are a condensation of two different traditions, namely "eight limb yoga" (aṣṭāṅga yoga) and action yoga (Kriya yoga). The kriya yoga part is contained in chapter 1, chapter 2 sutras 1-27, chapter 3 except sutra 54, and chapter 4. The "eight limb yoga" is described in chapter 2 sutras 28–55, and chapter 3 sutras 3 and 54.

There are numerous parallels in the ancient Samkhya, Yoga and Abhidharma schools of thought, particularly from the 2nd century BCE to the 1st century AD, notes Larson. Patanjali's Yoga Sutras may be a synthesis of these three traditions. From the Samkhya school of Hinduism, Yoga Sutras adopt the "reflective discernment" (adhyavasaya) of prakrti and purusa (dualism), its metaphysical rationalism, and its three epistemic methods to gaining reliable knowledge. From Abhidharma Buddhism's idea of nirodhasamadhi, suggests Larson, Yoga Sutras adopt the pursuit of an altered state of awareness. However, unlike Buddhism, which avoids stating whether self and soul exist, Yoga is physicalist and realist, like Samkhya, believing that each individual has a self and soul. The third concept that Yoga Sutras synthesizes into its philosophy is the ancient ascetic traditions of isolation, meditation and introspection, as well as the yoga ideas from the 1st millennium BCE Indian texts such as Katha Upanishad, Shvetashvatara Upanishad and Maitri Upanishad.

According to Wujastyk, referencing Maas, Patanjali integrated yoga from older traditions in Pātañjalayogaśāstra, and added his own explanatory passages to create the unified work that, since 1100 CE, has been considered the work of two people. Together the compilation of Patanjali's sutras and the Vyasabhasya, is called Pātañjalayogaśāstra.

Yogabhashya
The Yogabhashya is a commentary on the Yoga Sutras of Patañjali, traditionally attributed to the legendary Vedic sage Vyasa who is said to have composed the Mahabharata. This commentary is indispensable for the understanding of the aphoristic and terse Yoga sutras, and the study of the sutras has always referred to the Yogabhashya. Some scholars see Vyasa as a later 4th or 5th century AD commentator (as opposed to the ancient mythic figure).

Vyasa is, however, not the only commentator on the text. Another well-known commentator on theYoga Sutras is Vachaspati Mishra, who had also written commentaries on other schools of Indian philosophy such as Vedanta, Samkhya, Nyaya, and Mimamsa. After Vyasa, it is believed that Vachaspati Mishra’s commentary is the "next most authoritative." Other commentators include Bhoja Rāja, Vijñānabhikṣu, and Rāmānanda Sarasvatī. Vijñānabhikṣu, according to Bryant, wrote the "most insightful and useful commentary after that of Vyasa's." Bhoja Rāja and Rāmānanda Sarasvatī's commentaries follow the previous commentaries, without expanding much on what their predecessors have said. Hariharānanda Āraṇya, in contrast to the above figures, is a modern commentator on the text. Bryant explains that, even though "his is a standpoint exposed to Western thought", it is still "thoroughly grounded in tradition".

Scholars hold that both texts, the sutras and the commentary were written by one person. According to Philipp A. Maas, based on a study of the original manuscripts, Patañjali's composition was entitled Pātañjalayogaśāstra ("The Treatise on Yoga according to Patañjali") and consisted of both Sūtras and Bhāṣya. This means that the Bhāṣya was in fact Patañjali's own work.

The practice of writing a set of aphorisms with the author's own explanation was well known at the time of Patañjali, as for example in Vasubandhu's Abhidharmakośabhāṣya (that, incidentally, Patañjali quotes). These research findings change the historical understanding of the yoga tradition, since they allow us to take the Bhāṣya as Patañjali's very own explanation of the meaning of his somewhat cryptic sūtras.

The Yogabhashya states that 'yoga' in the Yoga Sutras has the meaning of 'samadhi'. Another commentary (the Vivarana) by a certain Shankara, confirms the interpretation of yogah samadhih (YBh. I.1): 'yoga' in Patañjali's sutra has the meaning of 'integration'. This Shankara may or may not have been the famed Vedantic scholar Adi Shankara (8th or 9th century). Scholarly opinion is still open on this issue.

Contents

Patañjali divided his Yoga Sutras into four chapters or books (Sanskrit Pada), containing in all 196 aphorisms, divided as follows:

Samadhi Pada
 Samadhi Pada (51 sutras). Samadhi is a state of direct and reliable perception (pramāṇa) where "the seer" (Purusha, pure consciousness, the Self) abides in itself. Samadhi is the main technique the yogi learns by which to calm the workings of the mind, whereafter Kaivalya, the isolation of 'the seer' from the impurities of the mind, is attained. The author describes yoga and then the nature and the means of attaining samādhi.
 This chapter contains the famous definitional verse (YS 1.2): "Yogaś citta-vritti-nirodhaḥ" ("Yoga is the restriction of the fluctuations of mindstuff"). When the mind is stilled, the seer or real Self is revealed:
1.3. Then the Seer is established in his own essential and fundamental nature.
1.4. In other states there is assimilation (of the Seer) with the modifications (of the mind).
 YS 1.33-39 mentions seven practices to still the mind, the seventh being meditative absorption (YS 1.39), which is further explained in YS 1.40-51 and YS 3.1-12.

Sadhana Pada
 Sadhana Pada (55 sutras). Sadhana is the Sanskrit for "practice" or "discipline," aiming at discriminative discernment, to discern the Seer (consciousness) from its objects and the hindrances. Here the author outlines two systems of Yoga: Kriyā Yoga and Aṣṭāṅga Yoga ('Eightlimbed Yoga').

Kriya Yoga
 Kriyā Yoga in the Yoga Sūtras is a preparation for Aṣṭāṅga Yoga (with three special elements of the Niyamas (2nd limb)):
2.3 tapas - austerity
2.4 svādhyāya - self-study of the scriptures
2.5 īśvara praṇidhāna – devotion to god or pure consciousness

Ashtanga Yoga
 Aṣṭānga Yoga is the yoga of eight limbs. In chapter 2, five "indirect aids" for purification and aiding insight are outlined:
1. Yama - restraints or ethics of behaviour; Yama consists of:
1.1 Ahimsa (Non violence)
1.2 Satya (Truthfulness)
1.3 Asteya (Non stealing)
1.4 Brahmacharya (Chastity)
1.5 Aparigraha (Non possession)
2. Niyama - observances; Niyama consists of:
2.1 Saucha (Cleanliness)
2.2 Santosha (Contentment)
2.3 Tapas (Austerity)
2.4 Svadhyaya (Selfstudy)
2.5 Isvara Pranidhana (Devotion to the lord)
3. Āsana - A physical posture in which one can be steady and comfortable.
4. Prāṇāyāma - control of the prana(breath)
5. Pratyahara - withdrawal of the senses
6. Dhāraṇā - concentration
7. Dhyāna  - meditation
8. Samādhi - absorption

Vibhuti Pada
 Vibhuti Pada (56 sutras). Vibhuti is the Sanskrit word for "power" or "manifestation". In chapter 3, the last three limbs of Aṣṭānga Yoga, known as samyama, are outlined:
6. Dhāraṇā - concentration
7. Dhyāna  - meditation
8. Samādhi - absorption
 Besides insight into pure awareness (purusha), samyama  gives 'supra-normal powers' (Sanskrit: siddhi), as the yogi gains access to and unites with the tattvas, the constituents of prakriti. The text warns (III.38) that these powers can become an obstacle to the yogi who seeks liberation.

Kaivalya Pada
 Kaivalya Pada (34 sutras). Kaivalya, "isolation", of the Seer from the contents of the mind so it is no longer disturbed by the movements of the mind. It stands for emancipation or liberation, and is used where other texts often employ the term moksha (liberation). The Kaivalya Pada describes the process of liberation and the reality of the Seer.

Philosophy

Metaphysics
The metaphysics of Patanjali is built on the same dualist foundation as the Samkhya school. The universe is conceptualized as of two realities in Samkhya-Yoga schools: Puruṣa (consciousness) and prakriti (mind, cognition, emotions, and matter). It considers consciousness and matter, self/soul and body as two different realities. Jiva (a living being) is considered as a state in which puruṣa is bonded to prakriti in some form, in various permutations and combinations of various elements, senses, feelings, activity and mind. During the state of imbalance or ignorance, one of more constituents overwhelm the others, creating a form of bondage. The end of this bondage is called Kaivalya, liberation, or moksha by both Yoga and Samkhya school. The ethical theory of Yoga school is based on Yamas and Niyama, as well as elements of the Guṇa theory of Samkhya.

Patanjali adopts the theory of Guṇa from Samkhya. Guṇas theory states that three gunas (innate tendency, attributes) are present in different proportions in all beings, and these three are sattva guna (goodness, constructive, harmonious), rajas guna (passion, active, confused), and tamas guna (darkness, destructive, chaotic). These three are present in every being but in different proportions, and the fundamental nature and psychological dispositions of beings is a consequence of the relative proportion of these three gunas. When sattva guna predominates an individual, the qualities of lucidity, wisdom, constructiveness, harmony, and peacefulness manifest themselves; when rajas is predominant, attachment, craving, passion-driven activity and restlessness manifest; and when tamas predominates in an individual, ignorance, delusion, destructive behavior, lethargy, and suffering manifests. The guṇas theory underpins the philosophy of mind in Yoga school of Hinduism.

Soteriology 

According to Bryant, the purpose of yoga is liberation from suffering, by means of discriminative discernment. The eight limbs are "the means of achieving discriminative discernment," the "uncoupling of puruṣa from all connection with prakṛti and all involvement with the citta." Bryant states that, to Patanjali, Yoga-practice "essentially consists of meditative practices culminating in attaining a state of consciousness free from all modes of active or discursive thought, and of eventually attaining a state where consciousness is unaware of any object external to itself, that is, is only aware of its own nature as consciousness unmixed with any other object."

While the Samkhya school suggests that jnana (knowledge) is a sufficient means to moksha, Patanjali suggests that systematic techniques/practice (personal experimentation) combined with Samkhya's approach to knowledge is the path to moksha. Patanjali holds that avidya, ignorance is the cause of all five kleshas, which are the cause of suffering and saṁsāra. Liberation, like many other schools, is removal of ignorance, which is achieved through discriminating discernment, knowledge and self-awareness. The Yoga Sūtras is the Yoga school's treatise on how to accomplish this. Samādhi is the state where ecstatic awareness develops, state Yoga scholars, and this is how one starts the process of becoming aware of Purusa and true Self. It further claims that this awareness is eternal, and once this awareness is achieved, a person cannot ever cease being aware; this is moksha, the soteriological goal in Hinduism.

Book 3 of Patanjali's Yogasutra is dedicated to soteriological aspects of yoga philosophy. Patanjali begins by stating that all limbs of yoga are a necessary foundation to reaching the state of self-awareness, freedom and liberation. He refers to the three last limbs of yoga as samyama, in verses III.4 to III.5, and calls it the technology for "discerning principle" and mastery of citta and self-knowledge. In verse III.12, the Yogasutras state that this discerning principle then empowers one to perfect sant (tranquility) and udita (reason) in one's mind and spirit, through intentness. This leads to one's ability to discern the difference between sabda (word), artha (meaning) and pratyaya (understanding), and this ability empowers one to compassionately comprehend the cry/speech of all living beings. Once a yogi reaches this state of samyama, it leads to unusual powers, intuition, self-knowledge, freedoms and kaivalya, the redemptive goal of the yogi.

Epistemology 
The epistemology in Patanjali's system of Yoga, like the Sāmkhya school of Indian philosophy, relies on three of six Pramanas, as the means of gaining reliable knowledge. These included Pratyakṣa (perception), Anumāṇa (inference) and Sabda (Āgama or Āptavacana, word/testimony of reliable sources).

Patanjali's system, like the Samkhya school, considers Pratyakṣa or Dṛṣṭam (direct sense perception), Anumāna (inference), and Śabda or Āptavacana (verbal testimony of the sages or shāstras) to be the only valid means of knowledge or Pramana. Unlike few other schools of Hinduism such as Advaita Vedanta, Yoga did not adopt the following three Pramanas: Upamāṇa (comparison and analogy), Arthāpatti (postulation, deriving from circumstances) or Anupalabdi (non-perception, negative/cognitive proof).

Of the three pramanas that it accepts as valid, pratyakṣa (perception) is the most important according to Yoga Sutras. It is superior to the other two sources because testimony (sabda) and inference (anumāna) are ultimately dependent on a prior perception. Bryant distinguishes Yoga school from the Vedānta, Nyaya and Mīmāṃsā in their prioritizing of different pramanas. The Mīmāṃsā school prioritizes testimony and the Nyaya school prioritizes inference. The Vedānta school has as its main source testimony from the Upaniṣads, whereas the Yoga school ascribes supreme authoritativeness to "direct, personal experience". Bryant argues that because of its favoring of direct experience the Yoga Sutras will "remain a perennial source of interest to the empirical dispositions of the modern world".

God 
Patanjali differs from the closely related non-theistic/atheistic Samkhya school by incorporating what some scholars have called a "personal, yet essentially inactive, deity" or "personal god" (Ishvara). Hindu scholars such as the 8th century Adi Sankara, as well as many modern academic scholars describe Yoga school as "Samkhya school with God."

The Yogasutras of Patanjali use the term Isvara in 11 verses: I.23 through I.29, II.1, II.2, II.32 and II.45. Ever since the Sutra's release, Hindu scholars have debated and commented on who or what is Isvara? These commentaries range from defining Isvara from a "personal god" to "special self" to "anything that has spiritual significance to the individual". Whicher states that while Patanjali's terse verses can be interpreted both as theistic or non-theistic, Patanjali's concept of Isvara in Yoga philosophy functions as a "transformative catalyst or guide for aiding the yogin on the path to spiritual emancipation".  Whereas the purusa (spirit, or true self) of the yogin is bound to the prakriti - the material body subject to karmas and kleshas, the special purusa called Isvara is immaterial and ultimately free.

Patanjali defines Isvara (Sanskrit: ईश्वर) in verse 24 of Book 1, as "a special Self/Spirit (पुरुषविशेष, puruṣa-viśeṣa)."} This sutra adds the characteristics of Isvara as that special Self/Spirit which is unaffected (अपरामृष्ट, aparamrsta) by one's obstacles/hardships (क्लेश, klesha), one's circumstances created by past or one's current actions (कर्म, karma), one's life fruits (विपाक, vipâka), and one's psychological dispositions/intentions (आशय, ashaya).

Philosophical roots and influences

The Yoga Sutras incorporated the teachings of many other Indian philosophical systems prevalent at the time. According to Zimmer, Samkhya and Yoga are two of several schools of philosophy that originated over the centuries that had common roots in the pre-Aryan cultures and traditions of India. Yet, the orthodox Hindu philosophies of Samkhya, Yoga, Vedānta, as well as the non-orthodox Nastika systems of Jainism and Buddhism can all be seen as representing one stream of spiritual activity in ancient India, in contrast to the Bhakti traditions and Vedic ritualism which were also prevalent at the same time. The Vedanta-Sramana traditions, iconolatry and Vedic rituals can be identified with the Jnana marga, Bhakti marga and the Karma marga respectively that are outlined in the Bhagavad Gita.

Samkhya
The Yoga Sutras are built on a foundation of Samkhya philosophy, and are generally seen as the practice while Samkhya is the theory. The influence of Samkhya is so pervasive in the Sutras that the historian Surendranath Dasgupta went so far as to deny independent categorization to Patañjali's system, preferring to refer to it as Patanjala Samkhya, similar to the position taken by the Jain writer Haribhadra in his commentary on Yoga. Patañjali's Yoga Sutras accept the Samkhya's division of the world and phenomena into twenty-five tattvas or principles, of which one is Purusha meaning Self or consciousness, the others being Prakriti (primal nature), Buddhi (intellect or will), Ahamkara (ego), Manas (mind), five buddhindriyas (sensory capabilities), five karmendriyas (action-capabilities) and ten elements. The second part of the Sutras, the Sadhana, also summarizes the Samkhya perspectives about all seen activity lying within the realm of the three Gunas of Sattva (illumination), Rajas (passion) and Tamas (lethargy).

The Yoga Sutras diverge from early Samkhya by the addition of the principle of Isvara or God, as exemplified by Sutra 1.23 - "Iśvara pranidhãnãt vã", which is interpreted to mean that surrender to God is one way to liberation. Isvara is defined here as "a distinct Consciousness, untouched by afflictions, actions, fruitions or their residue". In the sutras, it is suggested that devotion to Isvara, represented by the mystical syllable Om may be the most efficient method of achieving the goal of Yoga. This syllable Om is a central element of Hinduism, appearing in all the Upanishads, including the earliest Chandogya and Brihadaranyaka Upanishads, and expounded upon in the Mandukya Upanishad.

Another divergence from Samkhya is that while the Samkhya holds that knowledge is the means to liberation, Patañjali's Yoga insists on the methods of concentration and active striving. The aim of Yoga is to free the individual from the clutches of the matter, and considers intellectual knowledge alone to be inadequate for the purpose – which is different from the position taken by Samkhya.

However, the essential similarities between the Samkhya and Patañjali's system remained even after the addition of the Isvara principle, with Max Müller noting that "the two philosophies were in popular parlance distinguished from each other as Samkhya with and Samkhya without a Lord...." The Bhagavad Gita, one of the chief scriptures of Hinduism, is considered to be based on this synthetic Samkhya-Yoga system.

The Yoga Sūtras of Patañjali is a foundational text of the Yoga philosophy school of Hinduism.

Buddhism

Scholars have presented different viewpoints on the relationship between Patanjali's Yoga Sutras and the teachings in Buddhist texts.

Karel Werner writes, "Patanjali's system is unthinkable without Buddhism. As far as its terminology goes there is much in the Yoga Sutras that reminds us of Buddhist formulations from the Pāli Canon and even more so from the Sarvāstivāda Abhidharma and from Sautrāntika." He adds, "upon the whole it [Patanjali's Yoga sutras] is more elaborate and summarizes the actual technique of Yoga procedures more exactly than the Buddhist exposition". However, states Werner, "The Buddha was the founder of his system, even though, admittedly, he made use of some of the experiences he had previously gained under various Yoga teachers of his time. Patanjali is neither a founder nor a leader of a new movement. (...) The ingenuity of his [Patanjali's] achievement lies in the thoroughness and completeness with which all the important stages of Yoga practice and mental experiences are included in his scheme, and in their systematic presentation in a succinct treatise." Werner adds that the ideas of existence and the focus on "Self, Soul" in Patajali's Yogasutra are different from the "no Self" precepts of Buddhism.

According to David Gordon White, the language of the Yoga Sutras is often closer to "Buddhist Hybrid Sanskrit, the Sanskrit of the early Mahayana Buddhist scriptures, than to the classical Sanskrit of other Hindu scriptures". He adds, historical evidence suggests that yoga philosophical systems influenced, and were influenced by, other philosophical systems in India such as early Buddhism and Jainism. White mentions controversies about the Yoga Sutras. A significant minority of scholars, notes White for example, believes that Vyasa lived a few centuries after Patanjali and his "Hindu-izing" commentary subverted Yoga Sutras' original "Buddhist" teachings; while the majority scholarly view disagrees with this view.

Other scholars state there are differences between the teachings in the Yoga Sutras and those in Buddhist texts. Patanjali's Yoga Sutras for example, states Michele Desmarias, accept the concept of a Self or soul behind the operational mind, while Buddhists do not accept such a Self exists. The role of Self is central to the idea of Saṃyoga, Citta, Self-awareness and other concepts in Chapters 2 through 4 of the Yoga sutras, according to Desmarias.

According to Barbara Miller, the difference between Patanjali's Yoga Sutras and teachings in Buddhist texts is, "In Samkhya and Yoga, as in Buddhism and Jainism, the most salient characteristic of existence is duhkha or suffering. According to Buddhism, the origin of suffering is desire; according to Yoga, it is the connection between the observer (Purusha) with the observed (Prakrti). In both systems, the origin of duhkha is ignorance. There are also similarities in the means of deliverance recommended by the two systems. In Buddhism, the aspirant is asked to follow the eightfold path, which culminates in right meditation or samadhi. In Yoga, the aspirant is asked to follow a somewhat different eight fold path, which also culminates in samadhi. But the aim of yoga meditation is conceived in terms that a Buddhist would not accept: as the separation of an eternal conscious self from unconscious matter. The purpose of Patanjali's Yoga is to bring about this separation by means of understanding, devotion and practice."

Robert Thurman writes that Patañjali was influenced by the success of the Buddhist monastic system to formulate his own matrix for the version of thought he considered orthodox. The Yoga Sutra, especially the fourth segment of Kaivalya Pada, contains several polemical verses critical of Buddhism, particularly the Vijñānavāda school of Vasubandhu.

Jainism
The five yamas or the constraints of the Yoga Sutras of Patañjali bear an uncanny resemblance to the five major vows of Jainism, indicating influence of Jainism. Three other teachings closely associated with Jainism also make an appearance in Yoga: the doctrine of "colours" in karma (lesya); the Telos of isolation (kevala in Jainism and Kaivalyam in Yoga); and the practice of nonviolence (ahimsa), though nonviolence (ahimsa) made its first appearance in Indian philosophy-cum-religion in the Hindu texts known as the Upanishads [the Chāndogya Upaniṣad, dated to the 8th or 7th century BCE, one of the oldest Upanishads, has the earliest evidence for the use of the word Ahimsa in the sense familiar in Hinduism (a code of conduct). It bars violence against "all creatures" (sarvabhuta) and the practitioner of Ahimsa is said to escape from the cycle of metempsychosis/reincarnation (CU 8.15.1). It also names Ahimsa as one of five essential virtues].

Influence
The contemporary Yoga tradition holds the Yoga Sutras of Patañjali to be one of the foundational texts of classical Yoga philosophy. However, the appropriation - and misappropriation - of the Yoga Sutras and its influence on later systematizations of yoga has been questioned by David Gordon White, who has argued that the text fell into relative obscurity for nearly 700 years from the 12th to 19th century, and made a comeback in late 19th century due to the efforts of Swami Vivekananda, the Theosophical Society and others. It gained prominence as a classic in the 20th century. Its influence was reaffirmed by James Mallinson.

Before the 20th century, history indicates that the medieval Indian yoga scene was dominated by the various other texts such as the Bhagavad Gita and the Yoga Vasistha, texts attributed to Yajnavalkya and Hiranyagarbha, as well as literature on hatha yoga, tantric yoga and Pashupata Shaivism yoga rather than the Yoga Sutras of Patañjali. Much about yoga is written in the Mokṣadharma section of the epic Mahābhārata. The members of the Jaina faith had their own, different literature on yoga, and Buddhist yoga stems from pre-Patanjali sources.

Some of the major commentaries on the Yoga Sutras were written between the ninth and sixteenth century. After the twelfth century, the school started to decline, and commentaries on Patanjali's Yoga philosophy were few. By the sixteenth century Patanjali's Yoga philosophy had virtually become extinct. The manuscript of the Yoga Sutras was no longer copied, since few read the text, and it was seldom taught.

According to David Gordon White, the popularity of the Yoga Sutras is recent, "miraculously rehabilitated" by Swami Vivekananda after having been ignored for seven centuries. It was with the rediscovery by a British Orientalist in the early 1800s that wider interest in the Yoga Sutras arose in the West. Popular interest arose in the 19th century, when the practice of yoga according to the Yoga Sutras became regarded as the science of yoga and the "supreme contemplative path to self-realization" by Swami Vivekananda, following Helena Blavatsky, president of the Theosophical Society. It has become a celebrated text in the West, states White, because of "Big Yoga – the corporate yoga subculture".

Translations and commentaries
The Yoga Sutras of Patanjali was the most translated ancient Indian text in the medieval era, having been translated into about forty Indian languages and two non-Indian languages: Old Javanese and Arabic.

 In early 11th century, the Persian scholar Al Biruni (973-1050 CE) visited India, lived with Hindus for 16 years, and with their help translated several significant Sanskrit works into Arabic and Persian languages. One of these was Patanjali's Yogasutras. His translation included the text and a hitherto unknown Sanskrit commentary. Al Biruni's translation preserved many of the core themes of Yoga philosophy of Hinduism, but certain sutras and analytical commentaries were restated making it more consistent with Islamic monotheistic theology. Al Biruni's version of Yoga Sutras reached Persia and Arabian peninsula by about 1050 AD.
 The Yoga Sutras of Patanjali was translated into Old Javanese by Indonesian Hindus, and the text was called Dharma Patanjala. The surviving text has been dated to about 1450 CE, however it is unclear if this text is a copy of an earlier translation and whether other translations existed in Indonesia. This translation shares ideas found in other Indian translations particularly those in the Śaiva traditions, and some in Al Biruni translation, but it is also significantly different in parts from the 11th century Arabic translation. The most complete copy of the Dharma Patañjala manuscript is now held at the Staatsbibliothek in Berlin.

By the early 21st century, scholars had located 37 editions of Patanjali's Yoga Sutras published between 1874 and 1992, and 82 different manuscripts, from various locations in India, Nepal, Pakistan, Europe and the United States, many in Sanskrit, some in different North and South Indian languages. The numerous historical variants show that the text was a living document and it was changed as these manuscripts were transmitted or translated, with some ancient and medieval manuscripts marked with "corrections" in the margin of the pages and elsewhere by unknown authors and for unclear reasons. This has made the chronological study of Yoga school of philosophy a difficult task.

Many commentaries have been written on the Yoga Sutras.

Medieval commentaries
Medieval commentaries on the Yoga sutras include:
 Vācaspati Miśra (AD 900–980) who composed the commentary Tattvavaiśāradī, described as the "most significant early subcommentary".
 Bhoja Raja's Raja-Martanda, 11th century.
 Vijnanabhiksu's 16th century Yogabhashyavarttika or simply Yogavarttika ("Explanation of the Commentary on the Yoga Sutras" of Vyasa). The writer was a Vaishnava philosopher and exegete who tried to harmonize Samkhya and Vedanta and held the Bhedabheda view.
 Ramananda Sarasvati's Yogamani-Prabha (16th century).

Modern translations and commentary
Countless commentaries on the Yoga Sutras are available today. The Sutras, with commentaries, have been published by a number of successful teachers of Yoga, as well as by academicians seeking to clarify issues of textual variation. There are also other versions from a variety of sources available on the Internet. The many versions display a wide variation, particularly in translation. The text has not been submitted in its entirety to any rigorous textual analysis, and the contextual meaning of many of the Sanskrit words and phrases remains a matter of some dispute. Modern translations and interpretations 
include:

 1852, 1853: First translation of Yoga Sutras of Patanjali in English containing first two chapters by J.R Ballyntyne published by The Benaras College, in 1872 Govind Deva Shastri completed remaining two chapters.
 1882, 1885:The whole complete book was published in 1882 and final revised edition published in 1885. The Yoga Philosophy with comments of Bhojaraja, J.R Ballantyne, Govind Shastri Deva, edited by Tookaram Tatya, Bombay Theosophical publication fund.
 1883: Yoga Aporhism of Patanjali with the commentary of Bhoja Raja by Rajendra Lala Mitra, Asiatic Society of Bengal
 1890: The Yoga Sutra of Patanjali, by Manilal Nabhubhai Dvivedi, Bombay Theosophical publication fund.
 1896: Swami Vivekananda, Raja Yoga provides translation and an in-depth explanation of Yoga Sutra.
 1907: Ganganath Jha's Yoga Sutras with the Yogabhashya attributed to Vyasa into English in its entirety. With notes drawn from Vācaspati Miśra's Tattvavaiśāradī amongst other important texts in the Yoga commentarial tradition.
 1912: Charles Johnston Dublin University: The Yoga Sutras of Patanjali: The Book of the Spiritual Man.
 1914: The Yoga System of Patanjali with comment of Yoga Bhasya and explanation of Tatva Vicardi by James Haughton Woods, Harvard University Press
  1924: Patanjali Yoga Sutras with commentary of Vyasa and gloss of Vachaspati Mishra by Rama Prasad
 1953: Swami Prabhavananda, Patanjali Yoga Sutras, Sri Ramakrishna Math, Madras, India. 
 1961: I. K. Taimni, The Science of Yoga commentary with Sutras in Sanskrit and translation and commentary in English. 
 1963: Swami Hariharananda Aranya's Bhasvati.
 1976: Swami Satyananda, Four Chapters of Freedom. Yoga Publications Trust, Munger, Bihar, India.
 1978: Swami Satchidananda, The Yoga Sutras of Patanjali. Integral Yoga, Yogaville.
 1978: P. Y. Deshpande, The Authentic Yoga, Yoga Sutras of Patanjali: A Heartfulness publication in January 2021
 1989: Georg Feuerstein, The Yoga-Sûtra of Patanjali: A New Translation and Commentary, Inner Traditions International; Rochester, Vermont.
 1993: B. K. S. Iyengar, Light on the Yoga Sutras of Patañjali. HarperCollins.
 1996: Barbara Stoler Miller, The Yoga Sutras Attributed to Patanjali; "Yoga – Discipline of Freedom. University of California Press, Berkeley.
 2003: Chip Hartranft, The Yoga-Sutra of Patanjali: A New Translation with Commentary, Shambhala Classics, Boulder, Colorado.
 2009: Edwin F. Bryant's The Yoga Sutras of Patanjali: A New Edition, Translation, and Commentary. North Point Press, New York.
 2013: Swami Kriyananda, Demystifying Patanjali: The Yoga Sutras - The Wisdom of Paramhansa Yogananda. Crystal Clarity Publishers, Nevada City.

See also

 Patanjali
 Samkhya

Notes

References

Sources
Printed sources 

 

 
 

  

 

 
 

 

 

 
  [twelve lectures held at the fourteenth World Sanskrit Conference (Kyoto, September 1–5, 2009)]
 
 

 

 

 
 

 
 
 
 
 

  Bollingen Series XXVI; Edited by Joseph Cambell.

Web sources

General references

  Reprint edition; Originally published under the title of The Six Systems of Indian Philosophy.

Further reading
 History
 

Translations
 Bryant, Edwin F. (2009) The Yoga Sutras of Patanjali. New York: North Point Press. 
 

 Practice and commentaries
 Govindan, Marshall. Kriya Yoga Sutras of Patanjali and the Siddhas, Babaji's Kriya Yoga and Publications,2000, 2nd edition 2010,  
 Iyengar, B.K.S. (1993, 2002). Light on the Yoga Sūtras of Patañjali. Hammersmith, London, UK: Thorsons. 
 Master, E. K. The Yoga of Patañjali Kulapathi Book Trust 
 Swami Satyandanda Four Chapters on Freedom: Commentary on the Yoga Sutras of Patanjali

External links

Overview
 Edwin Bryant, The Yoga Sutras of Patanjali, IEP

Manuscripts
 Manuscript (Alfred Foucher) from Bibliothèque Nationale de France

Translations
 James Woods, The yoga-system of Patañjali; or, The ancient Hindu doctrine of concentration of mind; Yoga-sutras, of Patañjali (1914) Harvard University Press
 The Yoga Sutras of Patañjali, translation by BonGiovanni, at sacred-texts.com
 Yoga Sutras and related yoga texts, at sanskritdocuments.org
 The Online Companion to The Yoga-Sûtra Of Patañjali : A New Translation With Commentary by Chip Hartranft Arlington Center. Parallel Sanskrit, IAST and English text, and word-for-word translation

Yoga bhashya
 Ganganath Jha (1907), Yoga Philosophy with Vyasa Bhashya & Notes

Commentaries
 Patañjali - Yoga-Sutras: A word by word translation with grammar and comment
 The Yoga Sutras of Patañjali by Charles Johnston. Audiobook version* 
 
 "The Yoga Sutras of Patanjali" Rutgers University
 Yoga Sutras of Patañjali: a Buddhist Commentary.
 Audio lectures on the Yoga Sutras, by Swami Harshananda, at archive.org
 Yoga Sutras Online Program by A. G. Mohan
 Yoga Sutras Commentary by a Modern Mystic.
111 Audio lectures on the Yoga Sutras by Swami Tattwamayananda
 Science of Patanjali Yoga Sutras

Hindu texts
Sutras (Hinduism)
Ancient yoga texts